The Prizren District  is one of the seven districts of Kosovo. Its seat is in the city of Prizren. According to the 2011 Census, it has a population of 331,670 and an area of 2,024 square km (around 20% of the total area of Kosovo). Albanians form the majority of the district (85%). However, the district of Prizren is home to the biggest Bosniak and Turkish population in Kosovo, who make around 10% of the district's total population.

Municipalities 
The district of Prizren has a total of 5 municipalities and 195 other smaller settlements.

Demographics

Languages
Next to the standard provincial Albanian, Serbian and Bosnian, Turkish is also an official language and widely spoken in this district. The municipality of Mamusha is home to around 5,000 Turkish-language speakers.

Ethnic groups 
According to the 2011 census, the largest ethnic groups are Albanians. Other important ethnic groups are Bosniaks, Turks, Gorani, Roma and others.

Notes

References